A micropub is a very small, modern, one room pub founded on principles set up by Martyn Hillier of the first micropub, The Butchers Arms in Herne, Kent, which are "based upon good ale and lively banter".

Definition
A micropub, according to the Micropub Association, is defined as follows: "A micropub is a small freehouse which listens to its customers, mainly serves cask ales, promotes conversation, shuns all forms of electronic entertainment and dabbles in traditional pub snacks".

There may be differences between the pubs; they may or may not have a bar, they might serve beer straight from the cask or through hand pumps. They share a philosophy: a simple pub with the focus on cask beer and conversation for entertainment, with the basic premise of KIS, KIS – Keep It Small, Keep It Simple.

History

It became easier to set up a small independent pub in the United Kingdom following the passing of the 2003 Licensing Act, which became effective in 2005.

The original micropub, The Butchers Arms in Herne, Kent, was opened in 2005 by Martyn Hillier after spending several years as an off-licence. In 2009, Hillier gave a presentation to the AGM of Campaign for Real Ale (CAMRA), in Eastbourne, showing the simplicity of the micropub model and encouraging other people to follow.

It proved to be a catalyst with the Rat Race Ale House in Hartlepool six months later and Just Beer Micropub in Newark-on-Trent opening August 2010, soon after followed by The Conqueror Alehouse the same year. Since then, there have been several more micropubs opening such as The Just Reproach in Deal, Kent and the Bake & Alehouse in Westgate-on-Sea, Kent.

In June 2012, the Micropub Association was set up by Stu Hirst and Martyn Hillier as a resource for other would-be micropubs, to give free advice on the setting up and running of a successful micropub. Hillier wrote on his website:

“The Micropub Association will be a place where like-minded real ale lovers can share their micropub experiences. The Micropub Association will also be a platform for the new Micropubs to tell the beer drinking community about themselves. A successful Micropub is based upon good ale and lively banter and I want this to come across through the Micropub Association. Ultimately I’d like to think that we could become a useful lobby group to support the likes of CAMRA and SIBA, promoting the real ale experience”.

From 1 October 2014 the Micropub Association launched its official micropub recognition scheme, which allows micropub owners to register as a Recognised Micropub Member. To qualify a micropub must commit to holding up the tenets and ethics of the Association's definition of what it means to be a micropub. Once accepted a personalised certificate, with one year's validity, is issued for display in the establishment to demonstrate to visitors that it is promoting the ethics and tenets of what it means to be a micropub. In 2015, Hillier was named Campaign for Real Ale campaigner of the year for launching the Micropub Association.

In April 2015, planning permission was granted to open the first micropub in Scotland, in Kelso in the Scottish Borders.

Influence
In September 2012, CAMRA announced its 16 regional round winners of the 2012 National Pub of the Year (POTY) competition, amongst which were two micropubs, Just Beer in Newark, Nottinghamshire, (East Midlands regional winner) and The Conqueror Alehouse in Ramsgate, Kent, (Kent regional winner). In November 2012, CAMRA announced that The Conqueror Alehouse had been chosen to be one of the four finalists in this competition. In September 2014, CAMRA announced its 16 regional round winners of the 2014 National Pub of the Year (POTY) competition, amongst which was a micropub, The Door Hinge in Welling (Greater London regional winner).

Micropubs punch above their weight in quality, being around fifty times more numerous in the CAMRA Top Sixteen Pubs than their numbers would suggest.  Whilst micropubs constitute only 0.4% of all pubs that sell real ale, three of the CAMRA Top Sixteen pubs in its 2015 National Pub of the Year competition were micropubs, Hail to the Ale, One Inn The Wood and Yard of Ale. In November 2015, CAMRA announced that Yard of Ale (Kent regional winner) had been chosen to be one of the four finalists in this competition.

In April 2015, CAMRA announced that Martyn Hillier had been chosen as the Campaigner of the Year at its 2015 AGM for his tireless work giving advice to other would-be micropub owners and for founding the Micropub Association.

Literature
In March 2017, the first book devoted solely to micropubs was published. "The Micropub Guide : Enjoying the pint-sized pub revolution" is a 350 page paperback published by Duncan Petersen, which describes the concept, its history and development, with venue listings and has a foreword written by the concept's deviser Martyn Hillier.

See also

 List of bars
 List of public house topics

References

External links
 http://www.micropubassociation.co.uk/ Micropub Association
 https://www.youtube.com/watch?v=rCVXzu9xFUo/ A short video about The Butchers Arms
 http://micropubcrawl.co.uk/
 http://www.micropub.info/
 
 Micropubs in the UK [Directory]

Types of drinking establishment
Pubs